Gul  is a common name in Persian and Turkish languages, meaning rose. 
Gul is used as a family name in Europe, Central and South Asia. 

It is also a Nordic given name, used in Swedish, Danish,  and Norwegian languages as a short form of Guðólfr (Godwulf).

The name is also an abbreviation used in the medieval and early modern periods for William (derived from French Guillaume), for example in the signature "Gul: Ebor" for William Dawes, Archbishop of York.

Given name

Males
 Gul Bakhsh, Bengali poet
 Gul Hameed Bhatti, Pakistani journalist
 Gul Chaman, Afghan prisoner of the United States at Guantanamo Bay Naval Base
 Gul Haider, Afghan politician
 Gul Mohammed Jangvi, Afghan Taliban field commander
 Haji Alam Gul Kuchi, Afghan politician
 Gul Mohammad, Indian/Pakistani cricketer
 Gul Mohammed, Guinness world record holder as the shortest human being
 Gul Mudin (1994–2010), Afghan child premeditatedly murdered by United States troops
 Gul Rahman, Afghan torture victim
 Gul Hameed Khan Rokhri, Pakistani politician
 Gul Agha Sherzai, Afghan politician
 Gul Mohamad Zhowandai, Afghan poet

Females
 Gül Gölge (born 1981), Turkish model and actress
 Gul Panag (born 1979), Indian Bollywood actress
 Gul Panra (born 1989), Pakistani singer

Surname
Notable people with the surname Gul or Gül include:
 Abdullah Gül, President of the Republic of Turkey ın years 2007-2014.
 Aftab Gul, Pakistani cricketer
 Ajab Gul, Pakistani actor-turned-director
 Amir Gul, Pakistani footballer
 Awal Gul, Afghan prisoner of the United States at Guantanamo Bay Naval Base
 Dawd Gul, Afghan prisoner of the United States at Guantanamo Bay Naval Base
 Faruk Gül, Turkish American economist
 Gerardus Gul, Dutch bishop of the Old Catholic Church of the Netherlands
 Hamid Gul, former Director General of Pakistan's Inter-Services Intelligence
 Khi Ali Gul, Afghan prisoner of the United States at Guantanamo Bay Naval Base
 Meirchion Gul, 5th-century king of Rheged (modern-day northern England)
 Mohammad Gul, Afghan prisoner of the United States at Guantanamo Bay Naval Base
 Roman Gul, Russian émigré writer
 Sahar Gul, Afghan child bride tortured by her husband's family
 Sajjad Gul, Pakistani CEO
 Umar Gul, Pakistani cricketer
 Yekta Yılmaz Gül (born 1978), Turkish Greco-Roman wrestler

See also
 Gul (disambiguation)
 Gull (surname)
 Gülmira/Gulmira/Gol Mir (:ru:Гульмира)
 Gülnur/Gulnur
 Gülnar/Gulnar
 Nazgul
 Gulnaz
 Gulzhan/Guljan

References

Persian-language surnames
Turkish-language surnames
Pashto-language surnames
Kashmiri-language surnames
Turkish feminine given names
Indian feminine given names
Pakistani feminine given names
Persian unisex given names
Turkish unisex given names